The Immaculate Conception Cathedral, also Matehuala Cathedral, is a Catholic cathedral located in the city of Matehuala, in the state of San Luis Potosí in Mexico. Although the cathedral is open for worship, it is still under construction. Its style is neo-Gothic / neo-Byzantine.

The first stone was laid in 1906 with slight variations in its dimensions. The northern ship was the first body to be finished and to be used for religious celebrations, known by the matehualenses as "the ship". In the middle of the twentieth century the first phase of the cathedral's construction was completed at the end of the altar, the south nave and the lateral ones. The cathedral is not yet finished and the towers of the main façade are being built.

See also
Roman Catholicism in Mexico
Immaculate Conception

References

Roman Catholic cathedrals in Mexico
20th-century Roman Catholic church buildings in Mexico